Hualgayoc District is one of three districts of the province Hualgayoc in Peru.

References